Louisa Hay Kerr (1806 – December 1900) was an English author, composer, and translator. She published several translations including A History of Servia and the Servian Revolution by Leopold von Ranke from German to English in 1847. Her translation received praising reviews.

She was born in India and married Alexander John Kerr in 1825. She customary took his name to publish her works.

She published three collections of songs. The first appears to have been in 1832 entitled Melodies.  The second was  The Coronale: A Collection of Songs.

Works
 Melodies Illustrations by R. Westall and A. E. Chalon. (1832)
 The Coronale: A Collection of Songs (1837)
 Songs of Hope and Memory (1847)
 (Tr.) Ranke's A History of Servia and the Servian Revolution (1847) 
 (Tr.)
 (Tr.) Menzikoff or the Dangers of Wealth originally by Nieritz (1894)

References

19th-century British translators
1806 births
1900 deaths
German–English translators
19th-century women composers